Ren Mei'e (1913–2008) was a Chinese geomorphologist, geologist, marine and coastal scientist, educator and professor, who was the main founder for the study of many related subjects in modern China.

Biography
Ren was born in Zhenhai, Ningbo, Zhejiang, China on 8 September 1913. In 1934 Ren graduated from the Department of Geology of National Central University (now Nanjing University). In 1939 Ren received his doctorate from the University of Glasgow, Scotland.

Ren was a professor of Zhejiang University, Fudan University and later Nanjing University. He was the head of the Department of Geography (now School of Geographic and Oceanographic Sciences), Nanjing University.

Ren was selected to be an academician of the Chinese Academy of Sciences in 1980.

Academic positions
 Academician, Chinese Academy of Sciences (1980 election)
 President, Nanjing Institute of Geography and Limnology, Chinese Academy of Sciences (NIGLAS, formally known as the Geographic Institute of China)
 Honorary President, Chinese Society for Oceanography
 President and later Honorary President, Chinese Geographical Society

Honors and awards
Ren received the Victoria Medal from the Royal Geographical Society of London in 1986.

External links
 The Holeung Ho Lee Foundation - Ren Mei-E
 China Vitae - Ren Meie
 China Vitae - brief biography of Ren Meie

1913 births
2008 deaths
Academics of the University of Glasgow
20th-century Chinese geologists
Chinese geomorphologists
Academic staff of Fudan University
Members of the Chinese Academy of Sciences
Nanjing University alumni
Academic staff of Nanjing University
Scientists from Ningbo
Victoria Medal recipients
Academic staff of Zhejiang University